Dozdan may refer to:
 Dozdan, Fars
 Dozdan, Kerman